Paul Mullins Gervais (8 December 1925 – 29 April 1997) was a Liberal party member of the House of Commons of Canada. He was a lawyer.

From 1955 to 1967, Gervais served as an alderman of the Sherbrooke City Council.

He was elected to Parliament at the Sherbrooke riding in the 1968 general election. After completing one term, the 28th Canadian Parliament, Gervais left federal politics and did not seek re-election in the 1972 general vote.

External links
 

1925 births
1997 deaths
Lawyers in Quebec
Liberal Party of Canada MPs
Members of the House of Commons of Canada from Quebec
Sherbrooke city councillors